Sadovy is a rural locality (a khutor) in Krasnooktyabrskoye Rural Settlement of Maykopsky District, Russia. The population was 451 as of 2018. There are 23 streets.

Geography 
The khutor is in the valley of the Kurdzhips River, 11 km northwest of Tulsky (the district's administrative centre) by road. Tabachny is the nearest rural locality.

References 

Rural localities in Maykopsky District